Are You Afraid of the Dark? may refer to:
Are You Afraid of the Dark?, a 1991 television series
Are You Afraid of the Dark? (book series), a 1995 book series based on the television series
Are You Afraid of the Dark? (novel), a 2004 novel by Sidney Sheldon